Gill Township is one of nine townships in Sullivan County, Indiana, United States. As of the 2010 census, its population was 871 and it contained 416 housing units.

Geography

Cities, towns, villages
 Merom

Unincorporated towns
 Merom Station at 
 New Lebanon at 
 Riverton at 
(This list is based on USGS data and may include former settlements.)

Adjacent townships
 Hamilton Township (northeast)
 Haddon Township (southeast)
 Montgomery Township, Crawford County, Illinois (southwest)
 Lamotte Township, Crawford County, Illinois (west)
 Hutsonville Township, Crawford County, Illinois (northwest)
 Turman Township (northwest)

Cemeteries
The township contains these eleven cemeteries: Bennett, Burnett, Hollenback, Massey, Milam, Mount Zion, Old French, Parson, Pirtle, South and Webb.

Airports and landing strips
 Mann Airport

School districts
 Southwest School Corporation

Political districts
 Indiana's 8th congressional district
 State House District 45
 State Senate District 39

References
 United States Census Bureau 2008 TIGER/Line Shapefiles
 United States Board on Geographic Names (GNIS)
 IndianaMap

External links
 Indiana Township Association
 United Township Association of Indiana

Townships in Sullivan County, Indiana
Terre Haute metropolitan area
Townships in Indiana